Robert P. Linn (December 27, 1908 – August 22, 2004) was among the longest-serving mayors in the United States.

Biography
Linn was born in Burgettstown and grew up in Beaver. He worked for the Duquesne Light Company, and in 1945 was approached by a group of Republicans who wanted to defeat the incumbent mayor, a position then known as burgess. Initially, he did not want the job, but later gave in. Afterward he changed his mind, taking out a newspaper advertisement telling people to vote for his opponent. He won the election anyway and took office on January 2, 1946. Linn continued to serve as mayor for the next five decades. The position's original salary was $2,500 per year.

In 1995, he was officially listed in Guinness Book of World Records as the longest-serving mayor in the United States; in a 2002 interview, he said his major accomplishment in office was starting Streetscape, a town beautification project that replaced concrete sidewalks with red bricks and removed power lines from the main street.

Linn died in his sleep at his home in 2004 at the age of 95 and in the middle of his fifteenth term. The town council appointed councilman Thomas Hamilton to replace him.

He resided in a yellow apartment on Wilson Ave.

Sources

1908 births
2004 deaths
People from Beaver, Pennsylvania
Mayors of places in Pennsylvania
Pennsylvania Republicans
20th-century American politicians